Philip Geoffrey Doyne (31 October 1886 – 22 January 1959) was a British fencer. He competed at the 1920 and 1924 Olympic Games. Doyne was a two times British fencing champion, winning two foil titles at the British Fencing Championships, from 1912 to 1920.

References

External links
 

1886 births
1959 deaths
British male fencers
Olympic fencers of Great Britain
Fencers at the 1920 Summer Olympics
Fencers at the 1924 Summer Olympics
Sportspeople from Oxford